John Charles Kucks (July 27, 1932 – October 31, 2013) was a pitcher for the New York Yankees and Kansas City Athletics in Major League Baseball. In 1952, he was signed as an amateur free agent. Johnny Kucks won the final game of the 1956 World Series between the Yankees and Brooklyn Dodgers, shutting out the Dodgers, 9–0 at Ebbets Field—the last World Series game ever played in that ballpark.

Born in Hoboken, New Jersey, Kucks grew up in Jersey City and played baseball at William L. Dickinson High School.

Baseball career
On May 26, 1959 he was traded to the Kansas City Athletics, together with Jerry Lumpe and Tom Sturdivant, for Ralph Terry and Héctor López. On October 11, 1961 he was purchased by the Baltimore Orioles from the Athletics, but on December 1, 1961 the Orioles traded him to the St. Louis Cardinals for minor leaguer Ron Kabbes;  however, he never played again in the majors.

Personal
A longtime resident of Hillsdale, New Jersey since his days with the Yankees, Kucks worked as a stockbroker after his baseball career ended. He died of cancer on October 31, 2013, at the Villa Marie Claire hospice in Saddle River, New Jersey.

References

External links

1932 births
2013 deaths
American League All-Stars
Atlanta Crackers players
Baseball players from Jersey City, New Jersey
Burials at George Washington Memorial Park (Paramus, New Jersey)
Deaths from cancer in New Jersey
Kansas City Athletics players
Major League Baseball pitchers
New York Yankees players
Norfolk Tars players
People from Hillsdale, New Jersey
Rochester Red Wings players
Sportspeople from Hoboken, New Jersey
William L. Dickinson High School alumni